The Holy Ground is a local place name in the town of Cobh, County Cork, on the southern coast of Ireland. The song "The Holy Ground" is named after this area.

The place
The name is ironic, the piece of ground known as the Holy Ground was the town's red-light district in the 19th century when the town, then known as Queenstown, was a major stopping point for ships crossing the Atlantic and had a large throughput of seafarers.  There were plans to build a new yachting marina on the foreshore in front of the Holy Ground, but this is now uncertain.

The song
"The Holy Ground" is a traditional Irish folk song, performed by The Clancy Brothers, The Dubliners, The Jolly Rogers, the Poxy Boggards, the Brobdingnagian Bards, Mary Black, Pete Seeger, The Tossers, and Beatnik Turtle, among others.

John Loesberg points out that although the song is now closely associated with Cobh in Co Cork, it probably originated in Wales where it was known as Old Swansea Town Once More, or sometimes as The Lass of Swansea Town.

Robert Gogan describes how the song was a sea shanty sung by 
sailors as a mental diversion as they carried out various tasks at sea such as raising the anchor.

References

External links 
 http://unitedireland.tripod.com/id277.html

Irish folk songs
Irish songs
Buildings and structures in Cobh